Paxton is both a surname and a given name. Notable people with the name include:

Surname
 Bill Paxton (1955–2017), American actor
 Elisha F. Paxton (1828–1863), American Civil War general in the Confederate army
 Elizabeth Okie Paxton (1878–1972), American painter
 Floyd Paxton (1918–1975), American inventor and businessman
 Gary S. Paxton (1939–2016), American musician and record producer
 Geoffrey Paxton, Australian Anglican minister
 George Paxton (c. 1914–1989) American bandleader, composer, and arranger
 J. F. Paxton (1857–1936), Canadian ice hockey administrator 
 James Paxton (actor) (born 1994), American actor
 James Paxton (baseball) (born 1988), Canadian baseball pitcher
 James E. Paxton (born 1963), American politician
 Jerron "Blind Boy" Paxton (born 1989), American blues musician and singer
 John Paxton (1911–1985), American screenwriter
 John Paxton (footballer) (born 1890), English footballer
 John M. Paxton, Jr. (born 1951), United States Marine Corps lieutenant general
 Sir Joseph Paxton (1803–1865), English architect and botanist, designed the Crystal Palace for the Great Exhibition of 1851
 Ken Paxton (born 1962), American lawyer and politician, Attorney General of Texas
 Lonie Paxton (born 1978), American NFL pro football player
 Michael Paxton (born 1957), American filmmaker
 Mike Paxton (born 1953), American MLB pro baseball player
 Richard Paxton (1956–2006), English architect
 Robert Paxton (born 1932), American historian
 Sara Paxton (born 1988), American actress, musician
 Steve Paxton (born 1939), American experimental dancer and choreographer
 Thomas Paxton (1820–1887), Ontario businessman and politician
 Sir Thomas Paxton, 1st Baronet (1860–1930), Lord Provost of Glasgow from 1920 to 1923
 Thomas Paxton (1754–1804), captain of HMS Speedy (1798), lost in Lake Ontario
 Tom Paxton (born 1937), American folk musician, singer-songwriter
 See Paxton's Tower for William Paxton (1745–1824), London merchant and banker
 William Paxton (Australian businessman) (1818–1893), Englishman who made a fortune in South Australia
 William McGregor Paxton (1869–1941), American artist

Given name
 Paxton Baker, American businessman
 Paxton Fielies, South African singer, songwriter, and winner of Idols season 13.
 Paxton Lynch (born 1994), American football player
 Paxton Mills (1948–2001), American radio broadcaster
 Paxton Whitehead (born 1937), English actor

Fictional characters
 Emma Paxton, main character of The Lying Game series by Sara Shepard
 Sonya Paxton, in Law & Order: Special Victims Unit
 Paxton Fettel, main antagonist of the video game F.E.A.R.
 Paxton Hall-Yoshida, in the television series Never Have I Ever
 Paxton, a diesel engine from Thomas & Friends
 Paxton, the main character of the 2005 film Hostel, played by Jay Hernandez
 Paxton, protagonist of M. R. James's short story "A Warning to the Curious"

English-language surnames
English-language unisex given names